Ked or KED or ked may refer to:
 Ked (village), Jhunjanu district, Rajasthan 
 Keds (shoes)
 Kendrick extrication device, to extricate people from crashed vehicles
 Hippoboscidae, parasitic flies